Schinia maculata is a moth of the family Noctuidae. It is only known from south-eastern Texas.

The length of the fore wings is 13-13,8 mm for males and 13–15 mm for females. Adults are on wing in mid October.

External links
Nomenclatural validation of three North American species of Heliothinae

Schinia
Moths of North America
Moths described in 2004